A quarry lake is a lake that is formed after a quarry has been dug through a mining operation.

Formation 
During the mining process, water must be emptied. But after the mining operation has been abandoned, groundwater is allowed to seep in, and rainwater collects in the quarry. The depth of a quarry lake is dependent upon rainfall in the region.

Hazards to humans 
Water-filled quarries can be very deep, often  or more, and surprisingly cold, so swimming in quarry lakes is generally not recommended. Unexpectedly cold water can cause a swimmer's muscles to suddenly weaken; it can also cause shock, cold water shock and even hypothermia. Though quarry water is often very clear, submerged quarry stones and abandoned equipment make diving and jumping into these quarries extremely dangerous. Several people drown in quarries each year. Water-filled quarries can have dangerous electric currents in them that can be deadly under water.

Geology.com cites Mine Safety and Health Administration data in saying that between 2001 and 2017, there were 201 drowning deaths in abandoned mines in the United States, or around twelve per year; statistics from the Centers for Disease Control indicate that each year there are 3,960 drowning deaths.

Ecology 
Quarry lakes, even lakes within active quarries, can provide important habitats for animals.

References

External links

Lakes by type
Quarries